Neocollyris redtenbacheri is a species of ground beetle in the genus Neocollyris in the subfamily Carabinae. It was described by Horn in 1894.

References

Redtenbacheri, Neocollyris
Beetles described in 1894